Terra Alta may refer to:
Terra Alta (comarca)
Terra Alta, West Virginia
Terra Alta (DO)
Terra Alta Apartments
Terra Alta Bank